Ancretteville-sur-Mer (literally Ancretteville on Sea) is a commune  in the Seine-Maritime department in the Normandy region in northern France.

Geography

Population

Places of interest
 The church of Saint-Amand, dating from the twelfth century
 The eighteenth century Château d'Angerval.

See also
Communes of the Seine-Maritime department

References

Communes of Seine-Maritime
Populated coastal places in France